Claorhynchus (meaning "broken beak", as it is based on broken bones from the snout region) is a dubious genus of cerapodan dinosaur with a confusing history behind it.  It has been considered to be both a hadrosaurid and a ceratopsid, sometimes the same as Triceratops, with two different assignments as to discovery formation and location, and what bones make up its type remains.

History
The holotype specimen, AMNH 3978, was described by paleontologist and naturalist Edward Drinker Cope, who interpreted it as the rostral bone and predentary of an "agathaumid" (ceratopsid)  dinosaur, which he said came from the Laramie Formation of Colorado. It was soon thought to be a hadrosaurid, though.  In 1904, Franz Baron Nopcsa reclassified it as a ceratopsid. In their influential monograph, Richard Swann Lull and Nelda E. Wright regarded the genus as a dubious type of hadrosaurid, based on premaxillae and a predentary.

This opinion stood until the work of Michael K. Brett-Surman, who stated in his dissertation that, having rediscovered and reexamined the material with Douglas A. Lawson, it was most likely part of a ceratopsid's neck frill, probably part of the squamosal of Triceratops. This information reached Donald F. Glut's series of dinosaur encyclopedias in a confusing form; its entry states that a squamosal and tooth from South Dakota were referred to the genus, and these are what Brett-Surman and Lawson identified, keeping the supposed beak remains separate. Additionally, other major reviews have left the genus as an indeterminate hadrosaurid.

References

Ornithischian genera
Late Cretaceous dinosaurs of North America
Nomina dubia